"Too Good to Be True" is a song written by Gordie Sampson, Hillary Lindsey and Troy Verges, and recorded by American country music group Edens Edge.  It was released in April 2012 as the second single from their debut album Edens Edge.

This was Edens Edge's last single on Big Machine Records and remains their last single to be released as of 2013.

Critical reception
Bobby Peacock of Roughstock gave it 4½ stars out of 5, saying that it "is slick but not overdone or bombastic" and has "interesting similes and metaphors". It received 4 out of 5 stars from Billy Dukes of Taste of Country, who thought that the song's storyline was similar to other songs such as "Good Girl" by Carrie Underwood, but said that "the production is top-notch".

Music video
The music video was directed by Peter Zavadil and premiered in June 2012.

Chart performance

Year-end charts

References

2012 singles
Big Machine Records singles
Edens Edge songs
Music videos directed by Peter Zavadil
Song recordings produced by Dann Huff
Songs written by Gordie Sampson
Songs written by Hillary Lindsey
Songs written by Troy Verges
2012 songs